Roland Gerebenits (born 7 May 2000) is a Slovak professional footballer who currently plays for FC Petržalka.

Club career

MŠK Žilina
Gerebenits made his Fortuna Liga debut for Žilina against Senica on 12 August 2017. Žilina had destroyed Senica 7–1. Gerebenits replaced Miroslav Káčer, who scored one of 6 goals of Žilina to the point. Later on in the pitch Gerebenits witnessed the seventh goal by Michal Škvarka.

Loan at Pohronie
On 8 February 2020, Žilina had announced that Gerebenits and captain of the reserve squad, Peter Chríbik, will join Pohronie on half-season loan. In Gerebenits' case, it was noted as a step to help him penetrate Žilina's main squad. Consequently, unlike Chríbik, his contract did not include an option-to-buy clause. During the autumn half of the season, Pohronie already hosted former Žilina player Michal Klec.

Gerebenits made his Fortuna Liga debut for Pohronie on 15 February 2020 against Nitra at pod Zoborom. The match concluded in a goal-less tie, despite both teams being in a direct threat of relegation. Gerebenits played from the start, as a centre forward along with Ismar Tandir. In the 51st minute he was failed to convert a promising header, following a cross from Peter Mazan, from deep within the penalty area. Gerebenits was replaced by Patrik Blahút after less than 70 minutes. Chríbik also made his debut in the match.

Overall, he had concluded his spell with the Žiar nad Hronom-based club with 5 Fortuna Liga appearances, without scoring a goal, before concluding his loan on 30 June 2020 as an unnecessary player even though the season was not yet completed due to the delay caused by the COVID-19 pandemic. Manager Mikuláš Radványi opted not to extend the loan by few weeks needed to complete the season.

Loan at Železiarne Podbrezová
At the start of the 2020–21 season, Gerebenits headed for another loan. This time at a 2. Liga club Železiarne Podbrezová. His season-long contract included an option to purchase as he had failed to penetrate the senior squad of Žilina.

References

External links
 
 MŠK Žilina profile
 Futbalnet profile

2000 births
Living people
Sportspeople from Žilina
Slovak footballers
Slovakia youth international footballers
Slovakia under-21 international footballers
Association football forwards
MŠK Žilina players
FK Pohronie players
FK Železiarne Podbrezová players
Enosis Neon Paralimni FC players
FC Petržalka players
Slovak Super Liga players
2. Liga (Slovakia) players
Cypriot Second Division players
Expatriate footballers in Cyprus
Slovak expatriate sportspeople in Cyprus